The Life of Juanita Castro is a 1965 American underground film directed by Andy Warhol, filmed in March 1965.

Plot
A playwright (Ronald Tavel) taunts a number of actresses into improvising a play on Fidel Castro and his family, at a time when the revolution was bringing back disquieting stories of executions and imprisonments and, particularly, virulent hatred and torture of homosexuals in Cuba.

Several of the play's male characters (Fidel Castro, Raul Castro, and Che Guevara) are played by women. The actresses face a camera they believe is filming them, while in fact they are being filmed by another camera placed off to one side. At times they are directed by Tavel to perform pointless acts in unison. According to reviewer Tom Vick, the film "rewrites history as a high-camp farce," poking fun at machismo and totalitarianism.

Cast
Ronald Tavel as on-screen director
Marie Menken as Juanita Castro
Mercedes Ospina as Fidel Castro
Elektrah (Lobel) as Raul Castro
Aniram Anipso as Che Guevara
and as members of the Castro family: Harvey Tavel, Waldo Diaz-Balart, Ultra Violet, Jinny Bern, Amanda Sherrill, Bonny Gaer, Isadora Rose, Elizabeth Staal, and Carol Lobravico

See also
List of American films of 1965
Andy Warhol filmography

References

External links

1965 films
American avant-garde and experimental films
Films directed by Andy Warhol
1960s avant-garde and experimental films
1960s English-language films
1960s American films